{|
|}

The Extra EA-400 is a six-seat, single-engined, high-wing monoplane produced by Extra Flugzeugbau GmbH. The EA-400 is powered by a liquid-cooled Continental Voyager turbocharged piston engine.

Design

Started by Walter Extra, the company manufactures mostly aerobatic airplanes like the Extra EA-300 series. The EA-400 is a pressurized airplane for travelling, featuring carbon fiber construction, a cantilevered high wing, and a water-cooled Teledyne Continental TSIOL-550C engine. This engine is immune to shock cooling during descents, but more demanding to operate.

The airframe was designed with engineering help from the Technical University of Delft in Holland under leadership from Prof. Egbert Torenbeek and with contributions of Mr Loek Boermans for airfoil design.

The landing gear was designed and manufactured by Gomolzig in Germany. It is unusual in its geometry and sealed behind doors once retracted. Its complexity contributes to the aircraft's operating costs.

The optional weather radar pod is blended into the left wing tip.
All Extra 400 aircraft have been retrofitted with the flight into known icing conditions modification.
Deicing equipment consists of Teflon boots, a heated propeller, a heated windscreen for the pilot side, dual heated pitot ports, and a heated stall sensor connected to the autopilot.
The deicing equipment is powered by a pair of large alternators (100 and 85 amps) that also feed the AC compressor located in the tail.

The cockpit has good forward and lateral visibility. Avionics are conventional with a full set of instruments for each of the two crew and a central stack.
STCs for upgrades to modern GPS navigators and "glass cockpit" displays are available, but the only autopilot certified is the STEC 55X.

An improved propeller with the "b" type blades is available from MT-Propeller under FAA Form 337 Major Modification. It increases climb performance and cruise speed.

The passenger cabin is air-conditioned and offers four seats in a club arrangement with a folding table. It is similar in size to that of the smaller jets such as the Eclipse 550.

The Extra 400 was costly to manufacture, requiring 16'000 hours of labor, and carried a price tag of $1 million. Only 27 aircraft were built before the company ran into financial trouble.

Accidents & Incidents 

  A fatal accident occurred upon delivery of the first customer aircraft on August 21, 1998, due to flying into a storm, and this caused German authorities to impose a type rating on Extra 400 pilots which was withdrawn in December 2015.
  Another Extra 400 was lost to an engine failure on March 10, 2018, causing the aircraft to ditch in a field in Sharpsburg North Carolina with no casualties. The sole occupant was not injured.
  A third Extra 400 was lost in Oklahoma on August 4, 2018, due to unknown circumstances that caused the aircraft to lose altitude after takeoff and crash and burn with 5 fatalities.
  Emergency landing on 12 June 2020 after engine failure into a crop field. Due to limited visibility caused by leaking coolant into onto the windshield and unstable descent, the landing gear has collapsed, causing the wings to strike ground and the aircraft subsequently cartwheeled forwards, shearing off both wings. Single person, the pilot on-board was able to walk away from the accident with minor bruises. Aircraft is currently stored in LKPM in damaged condition, possibly written off.

Specifications (Extra EA-400)

See also

References

External links
 European Aviation Safety Agency: TYPE-CERTIFICATE DATA SHEET (EA 400)

2000s German civil utility aircraft
Extra aircraft
High-wing aircraft
T-tail aircraft
Aircraft first flown in 1996